The Big Night In with John Foreman was an Australian variety show airing on Network Ten and Ovation. It premiered on 3 December 2005 and concluded its first series 6 January 2006 then returned for another season in October 2006.

It ran overnight, usually starting at either 11.30pm or past 12am. The show's premise is based on having musical acts perform and give interviews in a late-night chat show format with a bigger focus on musical guests and interviews with those guests. It was hosted by John Foreman, a renowned Australian musician who has appeared on shows such as Good Morning Australia and Australian Idol as a musical director.

The show was notable for its premiere when an in-depth and engaging interview was featured with Russell Crowe. Crowe later performed two songs for the show. This episode also featured guests Tina Cousins and Deborah Conway. It often included ad lib promotions by the cast and guests, in a style reminiscent of Graham Kennedy's variety programs.

Episode guide
Series 1

Series 2

Burt Bacharach Special

On 10 October 2007, ‘John Foreman Presents Burt Bacharach’, a special presentation of The Big Night In, was broadcast on Network Ten. It was taped at the State Theatre in Sydney, and featured a line-up of Australian artists performing songs composed by Bacharach, accompanied by the Sydney Sinfonia. Bacharach appeared on the show, was interview by Foreman and performed his composition, “Alfie”.

New Year's Eve 2006 special
On 31 December 2006, a special episode was broadcast on the Ten Network featuring Anthony Callea, John Paul Young, Matthew Newton, New Zealand band Dragon, Jade MacRae and cabaret performer Maria Venuti. It was meant to be different from the telecasts that the Nine Network had provided in past years in that it was mainly aimed at a younger audience.

Despite that clear focus, older viewers and families complained about the content on the programme, calling talkback radio stations such as 2GB to complain the programme had strong language and sexual references; and that Newton was intoxicated, though there was little to none of the alleged content in the programme. Based on the talkback reaction, The Daily Telegraph, along with the daily tabloid programmes on competing networks (Today Tonight and A Current Affair) attacked Ten's broadcast. It is thought that those viewers and media sources may have been confused by another televised presentation the same night involving the musical Priscilla, Queen of the Desert.

The show aired from 9:30pm until 11:30pm, and was the lead-up to Network Ten's coverage of the New Year's Eve Sydney Fireworks.

The show was one of the last variety productions to be taped at Global Television's studios in North Ryde, NSW (Network Ten's former Sydney headquarters).

References

External links
 Official website
 The Big Night In MySpace Page
 Series 1 Official Site

Australian variety television shows
Australian music television series
Network 10 original programming
2005 Australian television series debuts
2006 Australian television series endings